Helvella vespertina is a species of fungus in the family Helvellaceae. It is found in Western North America under conifers. Some specimens have a white moldy appearance, having been colonised by the parasitic Ascomycete fungus Hypomyces cervinigenus.

References

External links

vespertina
Fungi described in 2013
Fungi of North America